The Cryptocoryneae are a small Aroid tribe consisting of the closely related genera Cryptocoryne Fisch. ex Wyd. and Lagenandra Dalzell.

References

Aquatic plants
Monocot tribes